Traveling Light is a 1944 French drama film directed by Jean Anouilh, starring Pierre Fresnay and Blanchette Brunoy. The narrative is set in 1931, when a man with amnesia tries to recover his memories from World War I, in order to find out what kind of man he really is. The film is based on Anouilh's 1937 play with the same title.

Cast
 Pierre Fresnay as Gaston
 Blanchette Brunoy as Valentine
 Pierre Renoir as Georges Renaud
 Marguerite Deval as Countess Dupont-Dufort
 Louis Salou as Maître Uspard)
 Odette Barencey as une parente
 Mercédès Brare
 Jean Brochard as Marcel Berthier
 Pierre Brûlé as the little boy
 Jenny Burnay as Juliette

Production
Just like with Jean Cocteau, World War II gave Jean Anouilh the opportunity to advance in the French film industry. Anouilh had written dialogue for several films in the 1930s, but Traveling Light was his directorial debut. He would eventually direct one additional film, Two Pennies Worth of Violets from 1951. The screenplay for Traveling Light was based on Anouilh's own 1937 play Le Voyageur sans bagage. Filming began on 4 October 1943.

Reception
The film premiered on 23 February 1944. It was successful although the records of the release are fragmentary, because the theatrical run coincided with the Allied invasion of France. The film was criticized by the church for its "systematic ridicule of the family".

References

1944 drama films
1944 films
1944 directorial debut films
Films about amnesia
French films based on plays
Films based on works by Jean Anouilh
Films set in 1931
French drama films
1940s French-language films
Films with screenplays by Jean Anouilh
Works by Jean Anouilh
French black-and-white films
1940s French films